St. Hedwig Parish - designated for Polish immigrants in Southbridge, Massachusetts, United States.

 Founded December 1916. It is one of the Polish-American Roman Catholic parishes in New England in the Diocese of Worcester.

On July 1, 2011 St. Hedwig Parish has been closed.

Bibliography 
 
 The Official Catholic Directory in USA

External links 

 St. Hedwig Parish - ParishesOnline.com
 St. Hedwig Parish - TheCatholicDirectory.com 
 Diocese of Worcester

Roman Catholic parishes of Diocese of Worcester
Polish-American Roman Catholic parishes in Massachusetts
Churches in Southbridge, Massachusetts